Arto Vilho Tolsa (9 August 1945 – 30 March 1989) was a Finnish footballer.

Career
Tolsa started his career in his hometown of Kotka, playing for Kotkan Työväen Palloilijat. He was promoted to first team as a 16 year old for 1962 second division season after successful match in a local competition in previous fall. Playing as a striker he scored an impressive 43 goals in 22 matches in his first season. He scored in 21 out 22 to matches in that season and still holds the record for second level of football in Finland. As an amateur he also worked at the local port. In 1964 he was a top goalscorer in Mestaruussarja. In 1969 he moved to Beerschot and turned professional. In Belgium He first played as a winger but was later transferred to central defender and became one of the key players for his team. He also played as a captain for Beerschot. In his last season for Beerschot he scored a winner in Belgian Cup final. After 1979 he returned to Kotkan Työväen Palloilijat where he ended his career in 1982. During his last years he suffered from alcoholism. Football stadium in Kotka is named after him.

Honours

Club
KTP
Finnish Cup: 1967, 1980

Beerschot
Belgian Cup: 1971, 1979

Individual
Mestaruussarja Top Goalscorer: 1964
Finnish Footballer of the Year: 1971, 1974, 1977

External links and references
 
 Finland - International Player Records

Specific

1945 births
1989 deaths
Finnish expatriate footballers
Finnish footballers
Finland international footballers
K. Beerschot V.A.C. players
Mestaruussarja players
Kotkan Työväen Palloilijat players
Association football defenders
People from Kotka
Sportspeople from Kymenlaakso